Calliostoma viscardii is a species of sea snail, a marine gastropod mollusk in the family Calliostomatidae.

Description
The size of the shell varies between 9 mm and 18 mm.

Distribution
This species occurs in the Atlantic Ocean off Eastern Brazil at depths between 20 m and 45 m.

References

 Quinn, J. F. Jr. 1992. New species of Calliostoma Swainson, 1840 (Gastropoda: Trochidae), and notes on some poorly known species from the Western Atlantic Ocean. Nautilus 106: 77-114.

External links
 To Biodiversity Heritage Library (1 publication)
 To Encyclopedia of Life
 To USNM Invertebrate Zoology Mollusca Collection
 To World Register of Marine Species
 

viscardii
Gastropods described in 1992
Molluscs of Brazil